Kauko Armas Nieminen (15 February 1929 – 2010) was a Finnish self-taught physicist.

Nieminen was born in Kuopio, Finland. Although he was most known for his works in physics, he did not have any academic training or degree in physics, but was entirely self-taught. He had a bachelor's degree in law from the University of Helsinki.

Nieminen's research and theories in physics were unusual. The basis of his work was the theory of "ether vortices". In principle, the theory claimed that the universe is filled with ether, and as the ends of the ether come close to each other vortices appear. The center of a vortex is an elementary particle. Nieminen claimed his theories can explain gravity, quantum phenomena, ball lightnings and the creation of the world.

Nieminen was also very critical towards the established scientific community, though not towards students of science, and had in fact been frequently invited to lecture to the same amidst mutual respect and good humor.

Nieminen had published several books. Nieminen did not use a commercial publisher or advertisement agency, but instead published and distributed his books and advertisements himself.

Kauko Nieminen was a deputy member of the city council of Helsinki from 2001 to 2004. In the 2000 municipal elections, he was a candidate from the joint election list of the independent candidates in the Helsinki Metropolitan area.

Publications
Eetterin fysiikkaa (1980)
 Eetteripyörteet voimina (1984)
 Sähkö eetteripyörteitä (1987)
 Tajunta ja sähköpyörteitä (1991)
 Luomisen pyörteet (1993)
 Tajunnan pyörteet (1993)
 Kokonaisuuden eduksi (1994)
 Aika ja aine (1995)
 Aika ja aine, osa 2 (1999)
 Luoja ja alkuluvut (2000)
 Voima (2002)
 Eetteripyörre (2003)
 Jatko (2004)
 Pyörteet (2005)
 Alkuluvut ja sähkö (2006)

References

External links
 An interview with Kauko Nieminen

1929 births
Finnish writers
2010 deaths
People from Kuopio
Pseudoscientific physicists